The office of head of government of Tokelau, often simply called the , rotates yearly between the  (leaders) of Tokelau's three atolls: Atafu, Fakaofo, and Nukunonu. The current  is Kelihiano Kalolo, the Faipule of Atafu atoll, who has held the position since 6 March 2023.

There have been 31  of Tokelau from 1993, when the office was established, to 2023.

List
The Ulu-o-Tokelau since the office's creation in 1993 have been:

See also
Administrators of Tokelau
Council for the Ongoing Government of Tokelau - executive body of the Tokelau government

References

 
Tokelau
Tokelau
Tokelau-related lists
1992 establishments in Tokelau